The Midnight Meat Train is a 2008 American horror film based on Clive Barker's 1984 short story of the same name, which can be found in Volume One of Barker's collection Books of Blood. The film follows a photographer who attempts to track down a serial killer dubbed the "Subway Butcher", and discovers more than he bargained for under the city streets.

The film was directed by Ryuhei Kitamura, and stars Bradley Cooper, Leslie Bibb, Brooke Shields, Roger Bart, Ted Raimi and Vinnie Jones. Its script was adapted by Jeff Buhler, the producer was Tom Rosenberg of Lakeshore Entertainment, and it was released on August 1, 2008. Producer Joe Daley, a long-time friend of Buhler's, brought the two writers together and helped develop the script, along with producers Anthony DiBlasi and Jorge Saralegui, for their and Clive Barker's production company Midnight Picture Show, which was responsible for Book of Blood, the next film adaptation from the anthology of short stories that spawned The Midnight Meat Train.

Plot
Leon is a photographer who wants to capture unique gritty shots of the city. He is crushed when, instead of giving him his big break, gallery owner Susan criticizes him for not taking enough risks. Emboldened, he heads into the city's subway system at night, where he takes pictures of an impending sexual assault before saving the woman. The next day, he discovers she has gone missing. Intrigued, he investigates reports of similar disappearances. His investigation leads him to a butcher named Mahogany, whom he suspects has been killing subway passengers for the past three years.

Leon presents his photos to the police, but Detective Hadley disbelieves him. Leon's involvement quickly turns into a dark obsession, upsetting his girlfriend Maya, who is also disbelieving of his story. Leon follows Mahogany onto the last subway train of the night, only to witness a bloodbath. The butcher kills several passengers and hangs their bodies on meat hooks. After a brief scuffle with Mahogany, Leon passes out on the train. He awakes the next morning in a slaughterhouse with strange markings carved into his chest.

A concerned Maya and her friend Jurgis examine Leon's photos of Mahogany, leading them to the killer's apartment. After breaking in, Jurgis is captured, though Maya escapes with timetables that record over a hundred years of murders on the subway. She goes to the police but finds Hadley still skeptical. When Hadley presses Maya to return the timetables, she demands answers. At gunpoint, Hadley directs her to take the midnight train to find Jurgis. Leon heads to a hidden subway entrance in the slaughterhouse, arming himself with several knives.

He boards the train as Mahogany completes his nightly massacre and corners Maya. Leon attacks the murderer with a knife, and the two fight in between the swinging human flesh. Human body parts are ripped, thrown, and used as weapons. Jurgis, hung from a meat hook, dies when he is gutted. The train reaches its final stop, a cavernous abandoned station filled with skulls and decomposing bodies. The conductor appears, advising Leon and Maya to "step away from the meat." The true purpose of the abandoned station is revealed, as reptilian creatures enter the car and consume the bodies of the murdered passengers. Leon and Maya flee into the cavern. Mahogany, battered, fights to the death with Leon. After Leon stabs a broken femur through his throat, Mahogany only grins in his dying throes, saying, "Welcome!"

The conductor tells Leon the creatures have lived beneath the city long before the subway was constructed, and the butcher's job is to feed them each night to keep them from attacking subway riders during the day. He picks up Leon and, with the same supernatural strength as the deceased butcher, rips out Leon's tongue and eats it. The conductor brings Leon's attention to Maya, who has been knocked unconscious and is lying on a pile of bones. The conductor forces Leon to watch as he cuts Maya's chest open to remove her heart. He says that, having killed the butcher, Leon must take his place.

Detective Hadley hands the train schedule to the new butcher, who wears a ring with the symbol of the group that feeds the creatures. The killer walks onto the midnight train and reveals himself as Leon.

Cast

Production

The film's original director, Patrick Tatopoulos, originally planned to shoot the film in 2005 in New York City and Montreal. Tatopoulos left the production in 2006 and was replaced by Ryuhei Kitamura. Shooting was moved to Los Angeles, due to the prohibitive cost of shooting in New York City. Various locations, including the L.A. Metro subway system, were used instead. Shooting began March 18, 2007.

Music
The "official" soundtrack from Lakeshore Records (only containing two remixes of the separately available actual film score) was produced and remixed by Justin Lassen and includes the bands and artists Iconcrash, Breaking The Jar, Blind Divine, Manakin Moon, Three Dot Revelation, Apocalyptica, Slvtn, Alu, Robert Williamson, Johannes Kobilke, Second Coming, Illusion of Order, Jason Hayes, Gerard K Marino, Penetrator, and Digital Dirt Heads.

Release
Initially, The Midnight Meat Train was set for a May 16, 2008, release but was delayed. Ultimately, the film's release on August 1 was limited to the secondary market, of which only 100 screens showed it, with plans for a quick release on DVD. The world premiere was on July 19, 2008, at the Fantasia Festival in Montreal, in the presence of director Ryuhei Kitamura. An internet campaign was started by several horror websites to draw attention to the scaled-down theatrical release.

Barker was angry with Lionsgate's treatment, believing the studio's president Joe Drake to be shortchanging other people's films to focus more attention on films like The Strangers, where he received a producing credit: "The politics that are being visited upon it have nothing to do with the movie at all. This is all about ego, and though I mourn the fact that The Midnight Meat Train was never given its chance in theaters, it's a beautifully stylish, scary movie, and it isn't going anywhere. People will find it, and whether they find it in midnight shows or they find it on DVD, they'll find it, and in the end the Joe Drakes of the world will disappear."

The Midnight Meat Train was released theatrically in Australia on February 19, 2009. DVD and Blu-ray releases followed on July 14.

Reception
Review aggregation website Rotten Tomatoes has a 72% approval rating based on 32 reviews. The site's consensus states: "A creative and energetic adaptation of a Clive Barker short story, with enough scares and thrills to be a potential cult classic."

IGN said, "Director Ryuhei Kitamura ... brings an incredible level of polish and visual sophistication to what is essentially a mid-range script. ... There's an energy to the film's final 10 minutes that's unmatched in recent horror films, and Kitamura's penchant for hard-hitting action, while suitably controlled, is always just below the surface. ... Overall, The Midnight Meat Train is a simple, bloody, hardcore offering certain to satisfy fans of the genre." 

Twitch Film said, "On most counts, The Midnight Meat Train succeeds. It's visually engrossing, the acting and story are mostly solid, and it has a great lead villain in Vinnie Jones. It only falters in an illogical last act. No matter. The gore factor is selling point to the genre crowd, and they don't have to worry. No punches are pulled. If this is the kind of quality material that Kitamura's going to deliver in Hollywood, I hope he stays there."

Cinematical called the film "easily the best Clive Barker adaptation since the first Hellraiser film," saying that "screenwriter Jeff Buhler manages to maintain the sly sense of dread that permeates the best of Barker's horror tales." 

Bloody Disgusting said that "Clive Barker fans will rejoice in what director Ryuhei Kitamura has given them. In the Japanese director's first English-language film, he has taken his visual genius from Alive and Versus and translated it into an action-packed bloodfest. It has been a long time since a major horror film has been given such loving treatment by its director." Conversely, DVD Talk said that while the story is "an interesting concept," it's "subpar" compared to the rest of Clive Barker's work, and criticized the film's "melodrama" and computer-generated effects.

References

External links

 
 
 
 
 

2008 films
2008 horror films
2008 psychological thriller films
2008 fantasy films
2000s slasher films
American horror thriller films
American slasher films
Films based on short fiction
Films based on works by Clive Barker
Films set in Los Angeles
Films shot in Los Angeles
Rail transport films
American splatter films
Lakeshore Entertainment films
Lionsgate films
Films directed by Ryuhei Kitamura
Films produced by Gary Lucchesi
American serial killer films
American supernatural horror films
Supernatural slasher films
American monster movies
American exploitation films
2000s English-language films
2000s American films